Australovenator (meaning "southern hunter") is a genus of megaraptoran theropod dinosaur from Cenomanian (Late Cretaceous)-age Winton Formation (dated to 95 million years ago) of Australia. It is known from partial cranial and postcranial remains which were described in 2009 by Scott Hocknull and colleagues, although additional descriptions and analyses continue to be published. It is the most complete predatory dinosaur discovered in Australia. It has been suggested that Australovenator is a sister taxon to Fukuiraptor, although some phylogenetic analyses find it to be a more derived member of the Megaraptora, possibly being part of the main Megaraptoridae family itself.

History of discovery 
 
Australovenator is based on a theropod specimen (AODF 604), affectionately nicknamed "Banjo" after Banjo Paterson, which was found intermingled with the remains of the sauropod Diamantinasaurus matildae at the "Matilda site" (AODL 85). The parts of the holotype as it was initially described, which are held at the Australian Age of Dinosaurs Museum of Natural History, consists of a left dentary, teeth, partial forelimbs and hindlimbs, a partial right ilium, ribs, and gastralia. Australovenator was described in 2009 by paleontologist Scott Hocknull of the Queensland Museum, and colleagues. The type species is A. wintonensis, in reference to nearby Winton. Although the holotype was first discovered in 2006 and first described in 2009, the process of excavating the "Matilda site" is still ongoing and papers describing new elements of the holotype are still being published.
Additional arm elements of the holotype were described in 2012, more leg elements were described in 2013, and a right dentary was described in 2015.

For some time, Australovenator was considered to be within the same genus as another Australian Megaraptorid called Rapator. Rapator is based on a metacarpal first described by Friedrich von Huene during the early 1900s and for prior to the recognition of Megaraptora, it was considered to be either an alvarezsaurid, or an intermediate theropod. After the discovery of Australovenator, some scientists noted the similarity between Rapator and Australovenator. While Hocknull et al. (2009) identified a few distinguishing characters between the two taxa, based on a poorly preserved metacarpal I from the holotype of Australovenator. Agnolin et al. (2010), reclassified Rapator, instead finding it a megaraptoran, potentially sister taxon to Australovenator. They mentioned that Megaraptor, the only other taxon also preserving metacarpal I, was less similar to Rapator than Australovenator. However, there were no clear differences between the two latter taxa. The metacarpals of both taxa were redescribed in White et al. (2014), who determined that they were not synonymous, adding multiple features two the potential characters identified by Hocknull et al. and Angolan et al. In 2019, material from the Eumeralla Formation was referred to Australovenator. In 2020 a paper was published on a heavily eroded specimen of an indeterminate megaraptoran found near the type locality consisting of "two fragmentary vertebrae, three partial metatarsals and the distal end of a pedal phalanx" as well as other indeterminate bone fragments. The animal was slightly larger than the holotype individual of Australovenator.

Description 

Because it was a relatively lightweight predator, Hocknull coined it as the "cheetah of its time". Like other megaraptorans, Australovenator would have been a bipedal carnivore.

Classification 
 
A phylogenetic analysis found Australovenator to be an allosauroid carnosaurian, with similarities to Fukuiraptor and carcharodontosaurids. In the initial analysis, it was shown to be the sister taxon of the Carcharodontosauridae. More detailed studies found that it formed a clade with several other carcharodontosaurid-like allosaurs, the Neovenatoridae. Recent phylogenetic analysis suggests Australovenator is a tyrannosauroid, like with all other megaraptorans. A phylogenetic analysis in 2016 focusing on the new neovenatorid Gualicho found that Australovenator and other megaraptorids were either allosauroids or basal coelurosaurs as opposed to being tyrannosauroids.

The ankles of Australovenator and Fukuiraptor are similar to the Australian talus bone known as NMVP 150070 that had previously been identified as belonging to Allosaurus sp., and this bone likely represents Australovenator or a close relative of it. Alternatively, this bone could belong to an abelisaur.

The cladogram below follows the 2010 analysis by Benson, Carrano and Brusatte. Another study published later in 2010 also found the Australian theropod Rapator to be a megaraptoran extremely similar to Australovenator.

The cladogram below follows the 2014 analysis by Porfiri et al. that finds megaraptorans to be tyrannosauroids.

Palaeobiology 
With very comprehensive and well-preserved hand and foot remains, Australovenator has been made a topic of various research papers studying the dynamics of theropod appendages.

 
A 2015 study tested the range of motion of Australovenator's arms using computer models and found that it had flexible arms, with the forearms capable of making an angle of 144 to 66 degrees with the humerus, an elbow range of motion similar to that of maniraptoriforms. Unusually, its radius could slide independently of the ulna when its arm was flexed, similar to that of birds but unlike most non-avian dinosaurs. However, the study also found that Australovenator's fingers were capable of extension far beyond those of any other sampled theropod, with only Dilophosaurus having capabilities even near it. This study concluded that Australovenator's flexibility, facilitated by a combination of traits in both primitive and advanced theropods, played a role in prey capture, giving it the ability to grasp prey towards its chest to make it easier for its weak jaws to disembowel food. The gracile morphology of the skull also concludes that this genus had a specialisation towards prey capture using its arms and hands.

A 2016 study used CT scans of an emu foot to digitally reconstruct the musculature and soft tissue of an Australovenator foot, as well as determine how soft tissue affects flexibility. The study determined that muscular range of motion is often overestimated when not accounting for soft tissue, and that soft tissue reconstruction is vital for making future analyses of theropod flexibility more accurate. A review of hindlimb elements described in 2013 re-identified several phalanges which were initially positioned incorrectly. In addition, it noted that Australovenator's phalanx II-3 was splayed, a pathology that may have resulted from the impacts of kicking motions. Some modern birds, such as the cassowary, are known to use their second toe as weapons in defensive or territorial fights.

A 2017 followup to the 2016 study used a 3-D printed model of the reconstructed foot to make footprints in a matrix of clay and sand in an effort to understand the creation of dinosaur footprints. The study specifically was designed to clarify the identity of particular controversial footprints from Lark Quarry, which may have been left from either a large theropod (like Australovenator) or an ornithopod (like Muttaburrasaurus). The study found that the artificial Australovenator footprints were similar to those at Lark Quarry, concluding that the trackways in question were likely those of a theropod. The writers of the study expressed interest in creating a reconstruction of a Muttaburrasaurus foot as an extension of the study, although no Muttaburrasaurus pedal material is known.

Palaeoecology 
It was recovered from the lower part of the Winton Formation, dated to the late Cenomanian. AODL 604 was found in a clay layer between sandstone layers, interpreted as an oxbow lake, or billabong, deposit. Also found at the site were the type specimen of the sauropod Diamantinasaurus, bivalves, fish, turtles, crocodilians, and plant fossils. The Winton Formation had a faunal assemblage including bivalves, gastropods, insects, the lungfish Metaceratodus, turtles, the crocodilian Isisfordia, pterosaurs, and several types of dinosaurs, such as the sauropods Diamantinasaurus and Wintonotitan, and unnamed ankylosaurians and hypsilophodonts. Plants known from the formation include ferns, ginkgoes, gymnosperms, and angiosperms.

References

External links 

Megaraptorans
Cenomanian life
Cretaceous dinosaurs of Australia
Paleontology in Queensland
Fossil taxa described in 2009
Taxa named by Scott Hocknull